Hernán Alberto Lisi (born 12 April 1971) is an Argentine football manager and former player who played as a defender.

Career
Born in Fighiera, Santa Fe, Lisi was a Newell's Old Boys youth graduate before making his professional debut with Banfield  in 1997. He subsequently Defensa y Justicia and San Martín de San Juan in his home country, also having a spell at Bolivian side Blooming before retiring.

Lisi began his managerial career in 2007, while acting as an interim manager of Banfield along with Vitamina Sánchez. He was subsequently Javier Torrente's assistant at Libertad and Cerro Porteño before being named in charge of Peruvian side Unión Comercio in January 2011.

Sacked by Comercio on 12 May 2011, Lisi moved to Chile after being appointed at the helm of Unión Temuco on 12 June 2012. He resigned from the latter in March 2013, and switched teams and countries again on 28 May after taking over Rubio Ñu in Paraguay.

On 26 December 2014, Lisi was appointed manager of Colombian side Deportivo Pereira. He resigned on 9 December of the following year, and moved back to Paraguay on 22 February 2016 after taking over Nacional Asunción.

Lisi returned to Colombia on 1 September 2016, replacing Torrente at Once Caldas. He left on a mutual agreement the following 24 April, and returned to Rubio Ñu on 25 June.

On 7 August 2018, Lisi moved back to Colombia after being named Deportivo Pasto manager, but left on 19 October after only 12 matches. On 14 December 2019, after more than a year without a club, he took over Peruvian side Academia Cantolao.

Lisi was sacked by Cantolao on 27 October 2020, and was appointed in charge of fellow league team Deportivo Municipal on 1 September of the following year.

References

External links

1971 births
Living people
Sportspeople from Santa Fe Province
Argentine footballers
Association football midfielders
Club Atlético Banfield footballers
Defensa y Justicia footballers
San Martín de San Juan footballers
Club Blooming players
Argentine expatriate footballers
Argentine expatriate sportspeople in Bolivia
Expatriate footballers in Bolivia
Argentine football managers
Club Atlético Banfield managers
Deportivo Pereira managers
Club Nacional managers
Once Caldas managers
Deportivo Pasto managers
Deportivo Municipal managers
Argentine expatriate football managers
Argentine expatriate sportspeople in Paraguay
Argentine expatriate sportspeople in Peru
Argentine expatriate sportspeople in Chile
Argentine expatriate sportspeople in Colombia
Expatriate football managers in Paraguay
Expatriate football managers in Peru
Expatriate football managers in Chile
Expatriate football managers in Colombia
Academia Deportiva Cantolao managers
Unión Comercio managers